is a Japanese actor who is noted for his roles as Kai in the 2007 Kamen Rider Den-O and as Gai Kurenai in the 2016 Ultraman Orb.

Filmography

Drama Series
2005: Brother Beat (TBS)
2005: Gokusen 2 (TV Asahi)
2006: Princess Princess D (TV Asahi)
2006: Kōmyō ga Tsuji (NHK), Toyotomi Hideyori
2007: Elite Yankee Saburo (TV Tokyo)
2007: Kamen Rider Den-O (TV Asahi)
2008: Gokusen 3 (NTV)
2008: The One Pound Gospel (NTV)
2008: Cat Street (NHK)
2009: RESCUE (TBS)
2009: Dandy Dandy (TV Asahi)
2010: Mattsugu (NHK)
2010: Chase (NHK)
2010: Hammer Session! (TBS)
2011: 99 Days With The Superstar (Fuji TV)
2011: The Tempest (NHK)
2012: Hungry! (Fuji TV)
2013: Saki (Fuji TV)
2014: Binta] (NTV-YTV)
2015: Daddy Detective (TBS)
2016: The Last Restaurant (NHK)
2016: Ultraman Orb (TV Tokyo)
2016-2017: Ultraman Orb: The Origin Saga (Amazon Video)
2017: Ultra Fight Orb (TV Tokyo)
2018: Ultraman Orb: The Chronicle (TV Tokyo)
2019: Ultra Galaxy Fight: New Generation Heroes (TV Tokyo)

TV Movies
2006:  (TBS)
2007: Byakkotai (TV Asahi)
2007: Himawari (TBS)
2009: Gokusen Graduation Special '09 (NTV)
2014: Ride Ride Ride (NHK)
2015: The Eternal Zero (TV Tokyo)

Movies
2008: Sing, Salmon, Sing!
2009: Elite Yankee Saburo
2009: Gokusen: The Movie
2009: Keitai Kareshi
2010: Higanjima
2010: Bushido Sixteen
2016: Tokyo City Girl
2017: Ultraman Orb The Movie
2018: Ultraman Geed The Movie
2019: BLACKFOX: Age of the Ninja
2020: Ultraman Taiga The Movie

References
Anime News Network-24 Apr 2016; Ultraman Orb Series Revealed With Star Hideo Ishiguro;
The Japan Times-24 Dec 2009; ' Higanjima';
Murguia,S.J;The Encyclopedia of Japanese Horror Films - Page 131;2016;

External links
On Twitter
On Instagram

1989 births
Living people
People from Tochigi Prefecture
Japanese male film actors
Japanese male television actors